The Autostrada A28 is an Italian motorway which connects Portogruaro to Conegliano and pass through Pordenone.

Route

References

Buildings and structures completed in 1974
Autostrade in Italy
Transport in Veneto
Transport in Friuli-Venezia Giulia